Kala Suri Raigama Bulathsinhalage Lucien Perera (born 25 December 1942), popularly as Lucien Bulathsinhala, is an actor and director in Sri Lankan cinema, theater, and television. Considered one of the iconic figures in Sinhala theater and television, Bulathsinhala has produced several critically acclaimed theater plays in a career spanning for more than five decades. His stage play Tharavo Igilethi is considered a hallmark in Sinhala theater history. Apart from acting, he is a versatile character who performed as director, poet, playwright and lyricist.

Personal life
He was born on 25 December 1942 in coastal village Wedikanda in Ratmalana, Sri Lanka. His father Raigama Bulathsinhalage Martin Perera was a dedicated socialist. His mother Senarath Godage Jane Nona was a housewife. He has three brothers and two sisters. He went to Dharmaloka College in Ratmalana for primary education. Then he attended to Dehiwala Central College for secondary education and passed the A/L examination in 1963. Later he graduated from University of Peradeniya. At that time, he passed the clerical examination and took over as the only clerk at the Ambewela Government Farm.

He was married to fellow actress Anula Mendis. Lucien met her when he went to act in Ranjith Tilakaratne's play Konthare. Anula made acting debut in 1967 with the stage play Ledak Nathi Ledek produced by R. R. Samarakoon. Then she appeared in several critically acclaimed stage plays such as Tharavo Igilethi, Rathu Hattakari, Madhura Jawanika, Kuveni, Mahasara in which some were made by Lucien himself. She died on 16 October 2020 at the age of 73. The couple has one daughter Indrachapa (born 1970) and one son Harsha (born 1971). Harsha is also an actor, singer and musician who acted in several popular television serials.

Career
During school times, he joined with Shanthi Faculty of Peace Arts and studied drama under Joseph Perera. He was the one who recognized Lucien's talents and first used him for an adult play where he played the character of a child begging on the street with his mother in poverty. After passing SSC exam he joined the Government Institute of Fine Arts where he passed the exam. He studied arts for a brief period at the institute and later quit due to commercial problems.

While still in school in the 1960s, he was fortunate enough to play the lead role Saliya in a tragicomedy play Ashokamala directed by the then examination commissioner L. L. K Gunasekara which was performed at the Lumbini Theater. During the same time, he made his maiden stage production Mannadiya. In 1964, he wrote the play called Noniwena Gini which took it to the State Drama Festival. In 1966, he performed in the Bihiwana Bosathaneni produced by Bandula Jayawardena and received a merit award at State Drama Festival. In the meantime, his play Noniwena Gini was invited to perform at the 1966 State Drama Festival as a guest play. He then acted in Ediriweera Sarachchandra's play Elova Gihin Melowa Ava. He also worked as a flutist in the orchestra of the play Pematho Jayathi Soko. 

In 1974 he produced the stage play Rathu Hattakari which became a popular play and critically acclaimed at several award festivals. In 1974 State Drama Festival, the play won the awards for the Best Script writing, Best Music, Best Actor and Best Acting. In 1981 he produced the popular stage play Tharavo Igilethi which made him one of the best dramatists in the country. The first performance of the play was on 24 July 1981 at Lumbini Theater. After 37 years of silence, he produced the stage play Ves Muhuna Galawanna in 2018.

In the meantime in 1971, he served as an announcer at Sri Lanka Broadcasting Corporation (SLBC) and later joined Jathika Rupavahini. In 1990, he was fired from the public service. After working in the Ministry of Transport for 11 years and then in the Sri Lanka Broadcasting Corporation, he got the opportunity to work in the Rupavahini Corporation from 25 November 1982. It was in the midst of many setbacks that he got to work in television. In the meantime, he was suspended and again got a job at a television corporation. But once again he was sent on compulsory leave in 1997. 

In 1980, he made his first songwriting with the song "Sandun Sihina Mandapaye" which was sung by Nanda Malini. In 1989, he won both Swarna Sankha and Sarasaviya Awards for the song "Marana Thunak Athi Minisa" for the film Siri Medura. Meanwhile, in 1994, he won the Swarna Sankha Award for the song "Gopalu Was Danden" for the film Mee Haraka. Then in 1998, he won the Presidential Award for Best Lyricist for the song Noselai Divi Makulu Asa made for the film Gini Avi Saha Gini Keli.

He is also a stage playwright as well as a stage actor who has demonstrated his acting skills on stage with the plays: Wahalak Nati Geyak, Dunna Dunugamuwe and Harima Badu Hayak. In 1967 he made cinema debut with the film Sadol Kandulu directed by Reggie Perera. He later played a prominent role in Vasantha Obeysekera's film Ves Gattho. Then he played the role of 'Frederick', the a gem robber in the film Chuda Manikyaya. However recently his best performance came through the blockbuster film Ho Gaana Pokuna where he played the role of village principle.

In 2017, he was honored with National Honors, even though he was forced to turn return home due to the lack of parking space. In 2018, he was honored at Presidential Awards. In 2019, The Janabhimani or Hela Maha Rawana Rajabhimani Awards Ceremony was held at the Jasmine Auditorium at the BMICH where Bulathsinhala won the Best Service Award.

Television serials
 Hathwana Kandayama 
 Jeewithaya Dakinna 
 Kinnara Damanaya 
 Kula Kumariya 
Natu Nathi Mal
Punchi Walawwa
 Siri Sirimal 
 Sudu Kapuru Pethi
 Vishwanthari

Stage Plays
 Mannadiya - (1963)
 Noniwena Gini - (1966)
 Rathuhattakari - (1974)
 Tharavo Igilethi - (1981)
 Sanda Langa Maranaya - (2009)
 Vesmuhunu Galawanna - (2018)

As a lyricist

 Ahasin Tharuwak Kada Wetenawa 
 An Nage Sal Aththe Pankiriththa
 Dangakari Man Madduma Doni 
 Deekiri Deekiri 
 Dethola nokee dea
 Dham Patin La Sanda 
 Kadeta Palayan Chun Chan
 Kanyawe 
 Kolom Thota Natha Mahaluwee
 Made Lagina Tharawan 
 Me Ganga Me Duru Katara Gewa 
 Minini Pode La Adure 
 Mutu Kuda Ihalana 
 Osari Poten Adinnepa 
 Pani Kurullane Nil Kobeiyane 
 Pinibara Yame 
 Pipunu Male Ruwa Emala Danido 
 Raja Maduraka Ipadi Sitiyanam 
 Sande Ahasa Wage 
 Sobawade Mepura
 Soduru Minisa
 Siri Yahane 
 Sudu Nanda Ai 
 Tharu Mal Yayama 
 Thattu Karanna Hemin 
 Viduli Mini Pahan 
 Yasa Isuru Pirunu Thena

Author work
 Pipuna Male Ruwa - 1985
 Khemadasa Nyaya Bhawithaya Saha Aragalaya - 2000
 Sinhala Opera Dekak - 2004
 Tharawo Igilethi - 2004

Filmography

See also
 Sri Lankan literature

References

External links

 Sri Lanka Actors

Sri Lankan writers
Sinhalese artists
Sri Lankan poets
Sri Lankan songwriters
1943 births
Living people
Kala Suri